The People's Debate with Vincent Browne was a topical debate TV3 television programme in Ireland. Presented by Vincent Browne, the two-hour-long broadcast occurred before a studio audience where audience members participated on the chosen subject(s). Initially airing on the first Wednesday of every month at 10 pm, in the months ahead of the 2016 general election it took to airing more regularly as it undertook a tour of all Dáil Éireann constituencies.

Origins
The People's Debate was launched by TV3 on 12 February 2014. The programme was described as an "experiment in democracy television" featuring a "range of hard hitting, intelligent and probing topics" with "no boundaries as it deals with serious current affairs issues in Ireland from topical matters, political discussion, economics and the affairs of the nation."

The first transmission occurred on Wednesday 5 March 2014. The final show aired on 22 February 2016.

Chairman
The programme was chaired by Vincent Browne, who also presents the four-times weekly Tonight with Vincent Browne.

Browne described the programme as "a new experiment in Irish television". He claimed: "This will be TV3's largest audience show to date with 150–200 people debating the important national issues of the day. There will be no panel of the usual important suspects – if the usual important suspects want to participate they will do so on the same basis as everyone else. This is democracy television."

List of episodes

Tour of constituencies
Browne toured the Dáil Éireann constituencies with the programme throughout 2015 and early 2016 (ahead of a general election), concluding with the constituencies of the four leaders of the parties with the largest representation in the 31st Dáil. The ruling party, Fine Gael, boycotted many of the early debates.

References

External links
Official website

2014 Irish television series debuts
2016 Irish general election
Virgin Media Television (Ireland) original programming